Tech CU (Technology Credit Union) is a Bay Area-based credit union.

History
Tech CU was founded in 1960 by a group of employees from Fairchild Camera and Instrument Corp. By the end of its first year of operation, Tech CU had 600 members holding $65,000. By 1970, the company had 6,320 members with $3.5 million in assets.

One of the San Francisco Bay Area’s largest credit unions, Tech CU has more than $2.5 billion in assets and ten full-service branches. It provides financial products and services to more than 100,000 members. In January 2015, the company acquired Sunnyvale Federal Credit Union — in the heart of Tech CU's coverage area. In July 2015, Tech CU opened its first branch in San Francisco at 1453 Mission Street.

In September 2015, Tech CU received Silicon Valley Business Journal’s Corporate Philanthropy Award, naming it one of the top 50 most generous companies in Silicon Valley. In October 2015, Credit Union Journal selected Tech CU for its Annual Best Practices Award, Growth Strategy. In January 2016, Tech CU was chosen for induction into San Jose Silicon Valley Chamber of Commerce Hall of Fame.

Membership
Anyone who lives, works, worships, or attends school in Santa Clara, San Mateo, Alameda, Contra Costa, Santa Cruz, or San Francisco counties can become a member of Tech CU. 

Membership can also be achieved by the following;

 Employees of Tech CU member companies
 Relatives of current Tech CU members
 Members of Tech CU’s affiliated organizations
 Employees and employers of public or private technology-based entities with a location in California.

Affiliated Organizations
Tech CU is affiliated with several different organizations. They include;

 The Financial Fitness Association
 The Northern California Human Resource Association (NCHRA)
 The San Jose State University Alumni Association (SJSUAA)

Community involvement
Tech CU has a community relations program which focuses on continued support of non-profit organizations in the areas of STEM Education and Workforce Development, Financial Literacy, Affordable Housing, and Health and Wellness.

Awards 
2018
 Communicator Awards: Excellence for Bank Happily Ever After Campaign Business to Consumer; Distinction for Campaign Branding
 Stevie Awards: Bronze, 2016 Annual Report and Card Manager
 Hermes Creative Awards: Platinum, TV Ads; Gold, Card Manager and Radio Ads; Honorable Mention, 2016 Annual Report
 CUNA Diamond Awards: Commercial TV and radio ads 
 AVA Digital Awards: Gold for Bank Happily Ever After Campaign; Gold for Digital Messaging to potential members; Honorable Mention for Lead Generation program
 S&P Global Market Intelligence: 3rd Best Performing Credit union 
 Marcom Awards: Card Manager 

2017:
 Credit Union Journal: Two Best Practices Awards - Family Banking and Visa credit card program 
 Stevie Awards: Bronze, Marketing Campaign of the Year; Bronze, Annual Report – Reinvention 
 Hermes Creative Awards: Gold, Website; Honorable Mention, 2015 Annual Report
 AVA Digital Awards: Gold Award for new Website
2016:
 Credit Union Journal: Best Practices Award for Web Redesign
 Hermes Creative Awards: Platinum, Point of Sale
 American Advertising Awards (ADDY): Silver, Integrated “Bank Happily Ever After” advertising campaign; Bronze, radio advertising
 Credit Union Journal Annual Best Practices: Award for innovative delivery channels (mobile, online, call center and branch)

References

Credit unions based in California
Banks established in 1960
1960 establishments in California